William Edward Peake (1888–1960) was an English footballer who played in the Football League for Bury and Sheffield United.

References

1888 births
1960 deaths
English footballers
Association football forwards
English Football League players
Northern Nomads F.C. players
Eccles United F.C. players
Sheffield United F.C. players
Bury F.C. players
Caerphilly F.C. players
Macclesfield Town F.C. players
Manchester North End F.C. players